Randall Tolson (1912 – 1954) was a clockmaker who lived in Cold Spring Harbor, New York for most of his adult life. In 1932, he was brought to trial for the murder of his brother but was later acquitted. Details surrounding the later parts of his life are less resolved, but it is known that he began to make memorial clocks for his brother.  The profits from the memorial clocks were used to support the Richard Tolson Memorial Clockworking Scholarship for first-year college freshman interested in learning the craft.  However, funds for the scholarship soon ran out after Randall Tolson's untimely death in 1954. The memorial clocks are now highly collectible.

1912 births
1954 deaths
American clockmakers
People from Cold Spring Harbor, New York